Matthew Warburton is the name of:

Matty Warburton, English footballer
Matt Warburton, American screenwriter